Trevor Williams (born Trevor Leslie Williams; 19 January 1945) is a bass guitarist, vocalist and lyricist known primarily for his work with Audience, British art rock band which ran from 1969 to 1972 and from 2004 -2013.

Williams was born in Hereford, Herefordshire. Beginning his musical career on lead guitar and accordion, he switched to bass in 1964, playing in numerous line-ups and backing chart artistes of the day such as Vince Taylor and Bert Weedon before joining soul band Lloyd Alexander Real Estate, which contained, or was associated with, the future members of Audience.  When Audience folded, Williams went on to play sessions for numerous artistes, also joining The Nashville Teens and Jonathan Kelly's Outside before retiring from the music business in 1975 to pursue interests in animal welfare, ultimately founding The Fox Project, a wildlife charity.

Williams reformed Audience in 2004 with other co-founders Howard Werth and Keith Gemmell, plus new drummer John Fisher, who died in 2008 and was subsequently replaced by Simon Jeffrey.  Audience finally folded in 2013 due to Gemmell's declining health and Williams' reluctance to continue with substitute musicians.

In 2009, Williams joined Blue Pulse, releasing, in May 2012, an album entitled Trams, largely featuring his own material.  The band has also served as backing band for vintage UK rock star, Terry Dene.

External links
Interview on The Marquee Club
Interview with Progsheet
Overview and Discography on AllMusic

1945 births
Living people
People from Hereford
English rock bass guitarists
Male bass guitarists